A.P. Warrior (foaled February 24, 2003 in Kentucky) is a thoroughbred race horse who was a Kentucky Derby contender in 2006 and Grade II winner on both dirt and turf.

Racing Career 
A son of A.P. Indy and Warrior Queen, he was owned and raced by Stanley E. Fulton, owner of Sunland Park Racetrack. Initially trained by Eoin Harty, John Shirreffs conditioned the horse for his last seven starts. He won four times in twelve starts.

In 2007, A.P. Warrior was retired and sold to Stonewall Farm in Versailles, Kentucky where he stands for $15,000.

Races

References

2003 racehorse births
Racehorses bred in Kentucky
Racehorses trained in the United States
Thoroughbred family 4-j